The General Federation of Private Railway and Bus Workers' Unions of Japan (PRU, Shitetsu Soren) is a trade union representing transport workers in Japan.

The union was founded on 10 January 1947 as a split from the Japan Transportation Labor Union Alliance.  It was a founding affiliate of the original Japanese Trade Union Confederation.  In 1949, it affiliated to the National Confederation of Trade Unions, but the following year, it left to become a founding affiliate of the General Council of Trade Unions of Japan.  It led a strike in 1952, and participated in the general transport strike of 1967, but generally focused on negotiation.  By 1967, it had 255,882 members.

In 1989, the union was a founding affiliate of the Japanese Trade Union Confederation.  By 2020, it had 113,253 members.

References

External links

Railway labor unions
Trade unions established in 1947
Trade unions in Japan